Duane Thomas Peters (born June 12, 1961) is a punk rock singer/songwriter and professional skateboarder. Active since 1975, he is probably best known as the singer in the California punk rock band U.S. Bombs, which formed in 1993.

Biography
Peters is credited for popularizing, or in his words "inventing" many tricks, such as the "acid drop" into a pool/bowl, the "layback grind", the "Indy air", the "Sweeper", the "backside layback grind revert", the "fakie hang-up" (a.k.a. "Disaster"), the "invert revert", the "fakie thruster", and the "loop of death", a full 360-degree rotation in a specially designed loop. He also, along with Neil Blender, helped to evolve the footplant into the more dynamic fastplant.

Peters was named Transworld Skateboarding'''s "Legend" in 2003. He is a professional skateboarder who rides for Pocket Pistols Skates. In May 2005, Black Label Skateboards released a biographic film, entitled Who Cares: The Duane Peters Story. A second documentary, planned by HavocTV, and intended to focus on the supposed path to sobriety of Peters girlfriend Corey Parks, was publicized but failed to appear. In 2006, a sober Peters had a cameo in the Joan Jett video Androgynous, directed by Morgan Higby Night.

Along with skateboarding, Peters is a well-known punk rock singer. He has formed bands such as the US Bombs, Political Crap, Die' Hunns (also known as Duane Peters and The Hunns), Duane Peters Gunfight, and Exploding Fuckdolls. He was formerly connected with two defunct record labels: Disaster Records, (owned by Patrick Boissel of Alive Records), and – later – Indian Recordings (owned by Ponk Media).

In 2000, Peters formed Duane Peters and The Hunns with Rob Milucky (previously of The Grabbers and The Pushers). Within two years, the band released three albums and undertook both national and European tours. At a The Damned show in 2002, Peters met Corey Parks, who had just left her previous band, Nashville Pussy. Parks joined Duane Peters and the Hunns on bass guitar and soon the band changed their name to Die Hunns because she was the worst bassist and the band was going to die. Die Hunns recorded a fourth album entitled Long Legs, Die' Hunns, and embarked on another tour.

Personal life
Peters' 20-year-old son, Chess (Chelsea) Peters, was killed in a car accident on July 6, 2007.

Duane has one child with Corey Parks, a son named Clash Peters.
Duane Peters has never been married, despite rumors, he was never married to Corey Parks.

 Discography 
Political Crap
 Appearance on Who Cares compilation LP
 Slow Death 7"Exploding Fuck Dolls
 American Bomb 7"
 Crack the Safe LP
 2012 Double CD Vinyl Dog Singles & Live '93 @ KUCIU.S. Bombs
 Scouts of America double 7"
 Put Strength in the Final Blow LP
 U.S. Bombs EP
 Garibaldi Guard! LP
 Nevermind the Opened Minds EP
 "Outtakes from a Beer City Basement" 7"
 Jaks 10" picture disc
 War Birth LP
 "Split w/ The Bristles" 7"
 The Great Lakes of Beer 7"
 "Hobroken Dreams" 7"
 The World LP
 2001/Lost in America Live LP
 "Tora Tora Tora" 7"
 Back at the Laundromat LP
 "Art Kills" 7"
 Covert Action LP
 Bomb Everything DVD
 Put Strength in the Final Blow: Disaster Edition CD
 "We are the Problem" 7"
 We are the Problem LP
 Death From Above 10" picture disc
 Generation Kennedy No More CD

Die Hunns
 "Not Gonna Pay" 7"
 Unite LP
 Tickets to Heaven LP
 Split with The Revolvers EP
 Wayward Bantams LP
 "Wild" 7"
 Long Legs LP
 "Time Has Come Today" 7"
 "Marshall Law" 7" Split with Radio One
 You Rot Me LP
 Live Fast... Die Hunns LP
 Live In Chi-Town DVD (Ambervillain Films)

Duane Peters Gunfight
 "Hell Mary"/"Gunfighter" 7"
 Duane Peters Gunfight LP
 Split w/ GG Allin 7" (2 different versions, US and UK)
 Forever Chess 7"
 Checkmate LP

The Great Unwashed
 Beautiful Tragedy LP

 Contest history 
 1st in 1981 Skate City Whittier Pro-Am: vert.

 References 

Bibliography
 Brooke, Michael (1999). Concrete Wave: The History Of Skateboarding''. .

1961 births
Living people
American people of Dutch descent
American punk rock singers
American rock songwriters
American skateboarders
Sportspeople from Orange County, California
Artist skateboarders
American male singer-songwriters
Singer-songwriters from California